Camerino Z. Mendoza Municipality is a municipality in Veracruz, Mexico. It is located about 85 km from state capital Xalapa. It has a surface of 37.84 km2. It is located at .In 1898 there is established the head-board of Necoxtla's Municipality, in Santa Rosa; for decree of 1910 in village of Santa Rosa, it rises up to the category of Villa. Santa Rosa Necoxtla, in 1930, is named Camerino Z. Mendoza. By decree of November 5, 1932, the Municipality of Santa Rosa Necoxtla, it is named Camerino Z. Mendoza; the decree of July 4, 1933 raises to the political category of city, the Villa of Camerino Z. Mendoza.

Geographic limits 

The municipality of  Camerino Z. Mendoza  is delimited to the north by Nogales, to the north-east by Huiloapan de Cuauhtémoc, to the south by Soledad Atzompa and to the south-west by  Acultzingo. It is watered by tributaries of the White river.

Agriculture 

It produces principally maize and beans.

Celebrations

In Camerino Z. Mendoza, in August takes place the celebration in honor to Santa Rosa de Lima Patron of the town.

Weather 

The weather in Camerino Z. Mendoza  is cold in all the year and has rains in summer and autumn.

Toponymy 

Named in honor of the great fighter of the Mexican Revolution, died in defense of its ideals of social justice Camerino Z. Mendoza.

Orography 

The Municipality is located in the zone center of the State, in spurs of the Sierra Madre Oriental.

Hydrography 

One is watered by tributary of the Blanco river.

Main Ecosystems 

The ecosystems that coexist in the municipality are the one of vegetation of pines, encino white and madroños; where a fauna composed by populations of wild mammals like rabbits, armadillos is developed, tlacuaches, raccoons, vixen and weasels.

Commerce 

The Municipality counts on 196 stores of clothes, 47 footwear, 7 stationery stores, 5 ironworks, 1 commercial house of materials for the construction, 13 houses with sale of parkings  and 35 slaughters.

Administrative subdivisión

The municipality is divided in two municipal agencies: Necoxtla and La Cuesta, whose agents are elect by means of popular plebiscite; in addition it exists a municipal subagency and 67 apple headquarters.

References

External links 
 
  Municipal Official Site
  Municipal Official Information

Municipalities of Veracruz